Anthropology in Morocco is this article refers to the history, themes, and publications related to ethnography and fieldwork conducted in the country.

Many scholars that conducted their fieldwork in Morocco and "published monographs that put the country in the center of anthropological debates on the nature of fieldwork (Dwyer 1982; Rabinow 1977), ethnographic writing (Crapanzano 1980; Munson 1984), and Islam (Eickelman 1976; Geertz 1968; Gellner 1981a)."

History 
Early writing about Moroccan culture came from travel memoirs of Europeans who went to Morocco on diplomatic or colonial or religious missions.

Many anthropologists started their interest in Morocco through the US Peace Corps program.

Later a e, written by Carleton Coon, an OSS agent turned  Harvard anthropologist wrote his memoirs,

In the 1960s, Clifford Geertz and Hildred Geertz along with their students lived in Sefrou, Morocco near the Atlas Mountains.

Anthropology as a Discipline 
Within Morocco, anthropology is rarely taught as a field of study. Many students within Morocco study culture through the discipline of sociology.

Notable Anthropologists 

 Aomar Boum
 Jacque Berque
 Vincent Crapanzano
 Kevin Dwyer
 Dale F. Eickleman
 David Montgomery Hart
 Clifford Geertz
 Ernest Gellner
 Deborah Kapchan
 Fatima Mernissi
 Rachel Newcomb
 Susan Ossman
 Stefania Pandolfo
 Paul Rabinow
 Lawrence Rosen
 Susan Slyomovics
 Emilio Spadola

References 

Moroccan people
Anthropology